Monte Leon Coleman (born November 4, 1957) is a former American football linebacker who played for sixteen seasons with the Washington Redskins from 1979 to 1994. He was the head football coach for the University of Arkansas at Pine Bluff.

Football career
Coleman played college football at the University of Central Arkansas in Conway, then a National Association of Intercollegiate Athletics (NAIA) school. He played safety his first three years before being converted to the linebacker position as a senior.  He set a school record with 22 interceptions and became the first player from Central Arkansas drafted in the NFL when the Redskins chose him in the 11th of the 12 rounds of the 1979 NFL draft with the 289th overall selection.

Coleman played for the Redskins in parts of three decades: the 1970s, the 1980s, and the 1990s. On the all-time list of games played as a Redskin, Monte Coleman is currently second having played in 217 games, Darrell Green is first. He is one of only three men to play at least 16 seasons with the franchise, along with quarterback Sammy Baugh (16) and Green (20).  Coleman’s 56.5 sacks are the team's fourth-highest all-time total.

Coleman played in the Super Bowl four times, winning three: Super Bowl XVII, Super Bowl XVIII, Super Bowl XXII, and Super Bowl XXVI.

NFL statistics

Number:51
Sacks: 43.5
 Interceptions: 17
Touchdowns: 3

Honors

Monte Coleman made “the all Madden Team” in 1993.

He selected by Washingtonian Magazine as the Washingtonian of the Year Award in 1996.
Coleman was inducted to the Arkansas Sports Hall of Fame in 1998.

In 2003, he was named one of the 70 Greatest Redskins.

Won 2007 Elijah Pitts Award (named after the Conway, Arkansas, native and Green Bay Packer legend) for Conway athletic lifetime achievement.

Enshrined to the Washington Redskins Ring of Fame on December 20, 2015.

Coaching career
Coleman was employed at the University of Arkansas at Pine Bluff as a linebacker coach and team chaplain. On November 26, 2007, Coleman was named head football coach at the university. On December 8, 2012, Coleman coached the Arkansas–Pine Bluff to a Southwestern Athletic Conference (SWAC) conference championship by defeating Jackson State, 24–21, in the SWAC Championship Game at Birmingham, Alabama.

Personal life
Coleman currently lives in Pine Bluff, Arkansas with his wife, Yvette, and their three children. His son, Kyle Coleman,  played for the Los Angeles Chargers.

Head coaching record

References

External links
 

1957 births
Living people
American football linebackers
Arkansas–Pine Bluff Golden Lions football coaches
Central Arkansas Bears football players
Washington Redskins players
Sportspeople from Pine Bluff, Arkansas
Coaches of American football from Arkansas
Players of American football from Arkansas
African-American coaches of American football
African-American players of American football
21st-century African-American people
20th-century African-American sportspeople